Jacob Notaras, also erroneously called Isaac, was a Byzantine aristocrat who survived the fall of Constantinople in 1453. Having attracted the Ottoman ruler Mehmed the Conqueror as an adolescent, he was confined to the seraglio until he escaped in 1460. He later became one of the leaders of the Byzantine diaspora in Italy.

Captivity 
Jacob Notaras the youngest son of Loukas Notaras, an "enormously wealthy" aristocrat from Constantinople who served as megas doux and grand admiral to the last Byzantine emperors. When Constanintople fell to the Ottoman ruler Mehmed II, Jacob was 14 years old. Jacob was said to be exceptionally beautiful and caught the attention of the sultan when the conqueror visited the house of Notaras. Three days afterwards, Loukas Notaras was executed along with his son and son-in-law, while Jacob was reserved for the pleasure of the sultan. Thus, after the execution of his father and brother, Jacob found the sultan’s favour by being added to Mehmed's harem, most likely as his catamite. He stayed in the seraglio until 1460 and then escaped from Adrianopolis to Italy, where he reunited with his three sisters: Anna, Theodora and Euphrosyne. He later married Elizabeth Zampetis, and apparently was unhappy with his personal life.

References

Bibliography 

15th-century Byzantine people
Greek expatriates in Italy
Constantinopolitan Greeks